Thomas Tharayil (5 May 1899 – 26 July 1975) was an eparchial bishop of the Knanaya Catholic Eparchy of Kottayam, belonging to the Syro-Malabar Church. He was born in Kaipuzha, India. He is buried in Christ the King Cathedral Kottayam.

References

Bibliography
 Tharayil, Jose, Mar Thomas Tharayil, A Collection of Historical Documents, Alwaye, 2001.
Mutholath, Fr. Abraham & Bijo Karakkattu (Editors), Jubilee Smruthi, Episcopal Silver Jubilee Souvenir of Mar Kuriakose Kunnacherry, Kottayam: Jyothi Book House, 1993.
 Mutholath, Fr. Abraham (Editor), The Diocese of Kottayam Platinum Jubilee Souvenir 1911-1986, Kottayam: Jyothi Book House, 1986.
 Poothrukayil, Fr. Luke (Editor), Episcopal Consecration Souvenir of Mar Mathew Moolakkatt, Kottayam: Jyothi Book House, 1999.

External links
Archdiocese of Kottayam website
Thomas Tharayil bio at Catholic-Hierarchy
Knanaya Catholic Region, USA
Knanaya Resources
Apna Des
Sunday and Feast Homilies

20th-century Eastern Catholic archbishops
Participants in the Second Vatican Council
Archbishops of Kottayam
1899 births
1975 deaths